A photographer (the Greek φῶς (phos), meaning "light", and γραφή (graphê), meaning "drawing, writing", together meaning "drawing with light") is a person who makes photographs.

Duties and types of photographers 

As in other arts, the definitions of amateur and professional are not entirely categorical.

An amateur photographer takes snapshots for pleasure to remember events, places or friends with no intention of selling the images to others.

A professional photographer is likely to take photographs for a session and image purchase fee, by salary or through the display, resale or use of those photographs.

A professional photographer may be an employee, for example of a newspaper, or may contract to cover a particular planned event such as a wedding or graduation, or to illustrate an advertisement.  Others, like fine art photographers, are freelancers, first making an image and then licensing or making printed copies of it for sale or display.  Some workers, such as crime scene photographers, estate agents, journalists and scientists, make photographs as part of other work.  Photographers who produce moving rather than still pictures are often called cinematographers, videographers or camera operators, depending  on the commercial context.

The term professional may also imply preparation, for example, by academic study or apprenticeship by the photographer in pursuit of photographic skills. A hallmark of a professional is often that they invest in continuing education through associations. While there is no compulsory registration requirement for professional photographer status, operating a business requires having a business license in most cities and counties. Similarly, having commercial insurance is required by most venues if photographing a wedding or a public event. Photographers who operate a legitimate business can provide these items.

Photographers can be categorized based on the subjects they photograph.

Some photographers explore subjects typical of paintings such as landscape, still life, and portraiture. Other photographers specialize in subjects unique to photography, including sports photography, street photography, documentary photography, fashion photography, wedding photography, war photography, photojournalism, aviation photography and commercial photography. The type of work commissioned will have pricing associated with the image's usage.

Photographers

Selling photographs 

The exclusive right of photographers to copy and use their products is protected by copyright. Countless industries purchase photographs for use in publications and on products. The photographs seen on magazine covers, in television advertising, on greeting cards or calendars, on websites, or on products and packages, have generally been purchased for this use, either directly from the photographer or through an agency that represents the photographer. A photographer uses a contract to sell the "license" or use of his or her photograph with exact controls regarding how often the photograph will be used, in what territory it will be used (for example U.S. or U.K. or other), and exactly for which products. This is usually referred to as usage fee and is used to distinguish from production fees (payment for the actual creation of a photograph or photographs). An additional contract and royalty would apply for each additional use of the photograph.

The contract may be for only one year, or other duration.  The photographer usually charges a royalty as well as a one-time fee, depending on the terms of the contract. The contract may be for non-exclusive use of the photograph (meaning the photographer can sell the same photograph for more than one use during the same year) or for exclusive use of the photograph (i.e. only that company may use the photograph during the term). The contract can also stipulate that the photographer is entitled to audit the company for determination of royalty payments. Royalties vary depending on the industry buying the photograph and the use, for example, royalties for a photograph used on a poster or in television advertising may be higher than for use on a limited run of brochures.  A royalty is also often based on the size at which the photo will be used in a magazine or book, and cover photos usually command higher fees than photos used elsewhere in a book or magazine.

Photos taken by a photographer while working on assignment are often work for hire belonging to the company or publication unless stipulated otherwise by contract. Professional portrait and wedding photographers often stipulate by contract that they retain the copyright of their photos, so that only they can sell further prints of the photographs to the consumer, rather than the customer reproducing the photos by other means. If the customer wishes to be able to reproduce the photos themselves, they may discuss an alternative contract with the photographer in advance before the pictures are taken, in which a larger up front fee may be paid in exchange for reprint rights passing to the customer.

There are major companies who have maintained catalogues of stock photography and images for decades, such as Getty Images and others. Since the turn of the 21st century many online stock photography catalogues have appeared that invite photographers to sell their photos online easily and quickly, but often for very little money, without a royalty, and without control over the use of the photo, the market it will be used in, the products it will be used on, time duration, etc. These online stock photography catalogues have drastically changed the landscape of the industry, presenting both opportunities and challenges for photographers seeking to earn a living through their craft. 

Commercial photographers may also promote their work to advertising and editorial art buyers via printed and online marketing vehicles. In today's digital age, social media has become an increasingly popular tool for commercial photographers to showcase their work and build their professional network, allowing them to reach a wider audience and connect with potential clients around the world.

Photo sharing
Many people upload their photographs to social networking websites and other websites, in order to share them with a particular group or with the general public. Those interested in legal precision may explicitly release them to the public domain or under a free content license. Some sites, including Wikimedia Commons, are punctilious about licenses and only accept pictures with clear information about permitted use.

See also
 List of most expensive photographs
 List of photographs considered the most important

References

External links
 
 
 Photographer – Merriam-Webster

Photography
 
Mass media occupations